The second and final season of the animated television series Kappa Mikey, created by Larry Schwarz, originally aired on the Nicktoons Network channel in the United States.

Season 2 of the series premiered on June 9, 2007 and concluded on September 20, 2008, on Nicktoons Network.

Deep into season 2, Kappa Mikey has stopped showing a LilyMu sequence at the end of an episode whenever it would make the episode too long, when the characters are in their LilyMu uniforms enough as it is, or when they successfully film a sequence without any mistakes before the ending.

Aired dates correspond to the Nicktoons Network, unless otherwise stated below. Episodes are in chronological order of the internal events, not necessarily in the order they were aired. The final three episodes aired in September 2008.

Cast

Main
Michael Sinterniklaas as Mikey Simon
Sean Schemmel as Gonard
Gary Mack as Guano
Kether Donohue as Lily
Carrie Keranen as Mitsuki
Stephen Moverly as Ozu
Jesse Adams as Yes Man

Episodes 

2007 American television seasons
2008 American television seasons
Kappa Mikey